Marston Green is a large suburban village of around 5,000 residents in the civil parish of Bickenhill and Marston Green, in the Metropolitan Borough of Solihull in the West Midlands. It lies within the historic county of Warwickshire.

Situated at the eastern fringe of the West Midlands conurbation, the village is adjacent to Birmingham Airport and the National Exhibition Centre. Marston Green railway station lies on the Birmingham loop of the West Coast Main Line railway and is served by West Midlands Trains local services to Birmingham and Coventry, and a small number of semi-fast services to Northampton and London Euston. Notable features of the area include a number of shops, the Marston Green Tavern, St Leonards Church and Marston Green Infant and Junior schools.

History
Marston Green began as a small village surrounded by agricultural land in the estate of Coleshill at this time, the village was known as Merstone The village grew into a leafy suburb in the late nineteenth and early twentieth centuries, due to the construction of many detached and semi-detached homes in the 1930s, which were typical of many suburban homes in the area.  The growth of homes here was encouraged by the presence of a rail station.  Following the expansion of the nearby Birmingham Airport, the construction of the National Exhibition Centre and the local housing estate of Chelmsley Wood, Marston Green has grown largely into a commuter village with many of its residents working in Solihull and Birmingham.

There was a Canadian air force base in Marston Green during the Second World War. Afterwards, the buildings were used as a maternity hospital and then a psychiatric hospital, then were demolished in the 1990s.

Famous people
Professional footballer, Terry Cooke who has played for Manchester United and Manchester City was born in the village on August 5, 1976.

Miles Hunt, lead singer of The Wonder Stuff, lived in Marston Green with his parents and brother in the 1970s and 1980s.

Stewart Talbot, professional Footballer who has played for Port Vale and Brentford amongst others.

Frankie Bunn who played for Luton, Hull City and Oldham and holds the record for the most goals scored in one game.

Dave Willetts, singer in musicals, was born in Marston Green on 24 June 1952 and was brought up in Acocks Green.

Ozzy Osbourne of Black Sabbath was born in the village on 3 December 1948.

David Willey  Mad Scientist on the Tonight Show with Jay Leno  was born in the village police station, where his father was the policeman, on November 4,  1947.

References

External links

1891 Ordnance Survey map of Marston Green
Marston Green & District Lions Club serving Marston Green and Chelmsley Wood since 1977
 Marston Green Lawn Tennis Club founded 1923

Villages in the West Midlands (county)
Solihull